Clathrina heronensis is a species of calcareous sponge fin the family Clathrinidae and found in the seas around Australia, and in the coastal seas of many islands to her north.  It was first described by Gert Wörheide  and John Hooper in 1999.

The species epithet describes it as coming from Heron Island where the holotype was collected.

Description
Large, irregular and loosely anastomosed tubes form the cormus. The spicules are very bright and can easily be seen. The mesohyl has many porocytes with brown granules. The skeleton has no special organization, comprising equiangular and equiradiate triactines. Actines are cylindrical, undulated and sharp at the tip.

References

Ecxternal links 

 Distriibution of Clathrina heronensis

Clathrina
Animals described in 1999
Sponges of Australia
Taxa named by John Hooper (marine biologist)
Taxa named by Gert Wörheide